Elegantogyaritus wakaharai is a species of beetle in the family Cerambycidae, and the type species of its genus. It was described by Yamasako, Hasegawa and Ohbayashi in 2012. It is known from Laos.

References

Gyaritini
Beetles described in 2012